The Royal Enfield WD/RE known as the "Flying Flea" was a lightweight British motorcycle developed by Royal Enfield for the British War Office (the WD came from War Department) as a means of transport that could be dropped by parachute or carried in gliders, to quickly carry messages and signals between airborne and assault troops where radio communications were not in place.

Development
The best known Royal Enfield produced for the Second World War was the  WD/RE 125 cc which was known as the Flying Flea and designed to be dropped by parachute with airborne troops.

After the German authorities stopped the Dutch franchisee of the DKW RT100 motorcycle from receiving any more supplies in 1938, preferring a non-Jewish company, Royal Enfield was contacted by the displaced importer about producing a similar motorcycle. Royal Enfield's version of the bike was produced by Ted Pardoe, who expanded the engine. Two prototypes under the name 'Royal Baby' were shown at Rotterdam in April 1939. Using a less sophisticated but increased-capacity two-stroke engine in the same frame, a few of these RE motorcycles were made before the outbreak of the Second World War.  

As with other British motorcycle manufacturers, the Royal Enfield factory production was turned over to the war effort.  Military motorcycles included the Royal Enfield WD/C 350 cc sidevalve, the Royal Enfield WD/D 250 cc sidevalve and the Royal Enfield WD/L 570 cc. 

In early 1942, the War Office ordered twenty WD/RE motorcycles from Royal Enfield for testing. Based on their 1939 civilian pre-war design, the prototype had a right hand brake and was fitted with an Amal carburettor and had a low-mounted toolbox.  The trials went well and led to some modifications, including fitting a twin-box exhaust system to help silence the noisy two stroke engine, a Villiers carburettor (indicated by a 'V' on the engine), raising the toolbox  and fitting a folding kick-start, footrests and even folding handlebars, so that it could be packed into the smallest possible space. A Miller lighting system was added, together with a sealed vent on the fuel filler to prevent spillage when the motorcycle was  packed in a drop carrier.  The foot brake was also relocated to the left side.

The reason the War Office wanted such a lightweight motorcycle was to establish communications between troops that had been dropped by parachute and the front line forces, who could be some distance away or out of radio contact. The problem was how to make sure that the Enfield landed without too much damage. In the summer of 1942 experimentation therefore began to develop a protective cradle that would go right round the motorcycle. A number of different versions were tested by dropping them from the bomb racks of aircraft such as the Halifax and Lancaster bombers. As well as surviving the drop, the cradles also had to be easy to remove on landing. The prototypes met neither requirement as they were too light and bent the wheels on impact but eventually a design was developed that worked with heavier tubing and increased bracing and in December 1942, went into production at the Enfield's Calton Hill factory in Edinburgh.

The first significant orders for the Royal Enfield WD/RE were consequently placed during early 1943, but after all the planning and preparation only a few were actually dropped into the battle zone by parachute, as it was decided to load them into troop carrying gliders four at a time without the protective frames, and secured by a special harness instead. A number of Royal Enfield WD/RE motorcycles were also used for beach landings during 1943 and 1944, and were carried inside landing craft for communication between the beaches and the nearest front line forces.

Early production bikes were fitted with a small taillight and military-issue headlamp fixtures to help hide the bikes and riders from enemy aircraft. The Flying Flea could run on any fuel and its light weight meant that soldiers could carry their bikes over otherwise impassable terrain.

Post war

There was a huge demand for cheap and reliable transport after the war so any surviving models which were disposed of as war surplus were stripped down and repainted for civilian use. Most of this work was carried out at Enfield's Bradford-on-Avon works in Wiltshire.  A few military Royal Enfield WD/RE motorcycles remained in limited service use until the end of the 1940s.

Royal Enfield also produced a civilian version of the bike in the post war years, the RE125, through 1950, when a foot-operated gear change lever was added and the front forks were modified to a telescopic style with internal spring dampening. In 1951 the RE2 was introduced with a redesigned frame and engine. The line ended in 1953 with the introduction of the Royal Enfield Ensign.

On 11 February 2020, Eicher Motors Limited, the parent company of Royal Enfield, registered for a new trademark for "ROYAL ENFIELD FLYING FLEA" with UIPO, the European Union Intellectual Property Office, sparking the hope in the motorcycle community that the name would be revived with a new small displacement motorcycle.

See also
 Welbike - a compact motorcycle for SOE use, parachute dropped at Arnhem (Operation Market Garden)
 BSA Bantam - Another motorcycle based on the DKW design

References

External links
 Video featuring Royal Enfield Flying Flea

Military motorcycles
WD/RE
World War II vehicles of the United Kingdom
Motorcycles introduced in the 1930s